E11, E-11, E.11 or E 11 may refer to:
 HMS E11, a United Kingdom Royal Navy submarine which saw service during World War I
 Bombardier E-11A, a United States Air Force aircraft
 E11, a postcode area in the E postcode area, covering the Leytonstone district in Greater London, England
 Bogo-Indian Defence, by Encyclopaedia of Chess Openings code
 E11, an infinite dimensional Kac–Moody algebra
 E11 screw, a type of Edison screw
 E11, a visa for the United States, see Alien of extraordinary ability
 Damansara–Puchong Expressway, Malaysia
 E 11 road (United Arab Emirates)
 European route E11, a European E route in France
 E11 European long distance path, a long-distance hiking path in Europe
 E11 Expressway in Japan:
 Tokushima Expressway (between Tokushima JCT and Naruto JCT)
 Takamatsu Expressway 
 Matsuyama Expressway (between Kawanoe JCT and Matsuyama IC)
 E11 (album), by Janice Vidal, 2014

See also 
 11E (disambiguation)
 European route E011